Samuel Ware (1781-1860) was a British architect, who worked for the sixth Duke of Devonshire on his properties in England and Ireland.

He is best known for having designed London's Burlington Arcade along the west side of Burlington House in Piccadilly for George Cavendish, 1st Earl of Burlington.

References

1781 births
1860 deaths
19th-century English architects